The 2005 Crystal Skate of Romania was the 7th edition of an annual senior-level international figure skating competition held in Romania. It was held between November 4 and 5, 2005 in Bucharest. Skaters competed in the disciplines of men's singles and ladies' singles.

Results

Men

Ladies

External links
 results

Crystal Skate Of Romania, 2005